Peter Bingham Hinchliff (25 February 1929 - 17 October 1995) was a South African Anglican priest and academic. He was the Regius Professor of Ecclesiastical History at the University of Oxford from 1992 to 1995.

Early life 

Hinchliff was born in South Africa on 25 February 1929 to an Anglican priest who had moved to the country in 1914. Hinchliff attended St. Andrew's College, Grahamstown He studied at Rhodes University, before moving to England. There he matriculated into Trinity College, Oxford, where he studied theology under Austin Farrer. Returning to South Africa, he attended St Paul’s Theological College, Grahamstown before his ordination.

Career

Ecclesiastical career 

Hinchliff was ordained deacon 1952 and priest in 1953. His first posting was as a curate in Uitenhage, Eastern Cape Province. From 1955 to 1959, he was sub-warden of his alma mater, St Paul's College, Grahamstown. In 1964, he was appointed a canon and chancellor of Grahamstown Cathedral.

In 1974, it was suggested that he was a candidate for the position of Archbishop of Cape Town, however Bill Burnett was eventually appointed. In January 1992, he was appointed a canon of Christ Church Cathedral.

Academic career 

From 1957 to 1959, Hinchliff was a Lecturer in Comparative Religion at Rhodes University. In 1960, he was appointed Professor of Ecclesiastical History. He resigned the position in 1969 in protest against apartheid that had worsened with the passing of the Separate Representation of Voters Amendment Act, 1968. From 1969 until 1972 Hinchliff served as secretary of the Missionary and Ecumenical Council of the Church Assembly. In 1972 he became Chaplain and Fellow of Balliol College in Oxford.

In January 1992, Hinchliff was appointed Regius Professor of Ecclesiastical History and Fellow of Christ Church, Oxford.

Publications

Notes

References 

 

1929 births
1995 deaths
20th-century South African Anglican priests
Regius Professors of Ecclesiastical History
Rhodes University alumni
Alumni of Trinity College, Oxford
Alumni of St. Andrew's College, Grahamstown
St Paul's College, Grahamstown alumni
Academic staff of St Paul's College, Grahamstown